Gaza Strip First League is one of the two second-tier leagues in the Palestinian football league system.

Past champions
2011–12: Al-Sadaqa
2012–13: Hilal Gaza
2013–14: Khadamat Khanyounis

2
Second level football leagues in Asia